The 2018 LSU vs. Texas A&M football game was a regular-season college football game played between the LSU Tigers and the Texas A&M Aggies. The game was played on November 24, 2018, at Kyle Field in College Station, Texas, and was the final regular-season game for both teams. The game set multiple National Collegiate Athletic Association (NCAA) records, including the most combined points scored (146) in a  Division I Football Bowl Subdivision (FBS) football game. The record was previously held by a game played between Western Michigan and Buffalo on October 7, 2017, which had 139 combined points over seven overtimes. The 2018 LSU–Texas A&M game went likewise to seven overtimes and lasted nearly five hours, tying the NCAA record for longest football game with four others. The 146 combined points are currently the second most in college football history since the NCAA started keeping records in 1937, behind the 161 points scored in a 2008 NCAA Division II game between Abilene Christian and West Texas A&M of the Lone Star Conference.

After the game-winning touchdown, Texas A&M fans ran onto the field in violation of the SEC's competition area policy.   As a result, Texas A&M was fined a total of $50,000 and warned by the SEC that subsequent actions by fans in future games will result in penalties over $100,000.

Background and teams

This game was the 57th meeting between LSU and Texas A&M. Prior to their 2018 meeting, the rivalry series stood at 33–20–3 in favor of LSU. Previously, the highest scoring meeting between the two teams was two years prior; LSU defeated Texas A&M 54–39, combining for 93 points. Texas A&M had lost seven straight against LSU, starting with the 2011 Cotton Bowl. The win would be Texas A&M's first win against LSU as a member of the SEC - their last win against the Tigers came on September 2, 1995, the last year for the Southwest Conference before Texas A&M and three other SWC members joined with the Big 8 to form the new Big 12.

LSU

Under the command of 3rd-year head coach Ed Orgeron, the LSU Tigers entered their final regular season game 9–2, 5–2 in SEC play. The Tigers were ranked No. 25 in the AP preseason poll, but were up to No. 5 for their fifth game after wins over No. 8 Miami and No. 7 Auburn. They fell to No. 22 Florida on the road to open October, but rebounded with a 20-point home win against No. 2 Georgia and a 16-point home win against No. 22 Mississippi State. This set up the most anticipated SEC game of the year - then No. 4 Tigers hosted No. 1 Alabama, falling 0–29. They picked up two more wins (at Arkansas and vs Rice), putting them at 9–2 going into their final game. LSU was ranked No. 8 by both the AP Poll and Coaches Poll, and No. 7 by the College Football Playoff selection committee.

Texas A&M

With first-year head coach Jimbo Fisher, the Aggies came into their last regular season game with a record of 7–4, 4–3 in SEC play. Two of their first four games were against ranked teams - they lost against No. 2 Clemson and No. 1 Alabama. They gained their first conference win the next week against Arkansas, and their second the week after with an upset over No. 13 Kentucky. They peaked in the rankings at No. 16, but lost two straight games to Mississippi State and Auburn and dropped out. They rebounded with wins over Ole Miss, making them bowl eligible, and UAB; this put them at 7–4 going into their last game of the season. Texas A&M received votes in the AP Poll and Coaches Poll, but was ranked No. 22 by the College Football Playoff committee.

Game summary

Game information

Scoring summary

Game statistics

Team statistics

Game leaders

Post-game altercation
After the game, LSU analyst Steve Kragthorpe reported to media that an unknown student with sideline credentials had punched him in the pacemaker.  The student was later identified to be Texas A&M staffer Cole Fisher, the nephew of Texas A&M coach Jimbo Fisher. According to Kragthorpe, he was punched in response to telling Texas A&M's receiving coach, Dameyune Craig, to "move on" after Craig yelled profanities at LSU's coaching staff. In defense of Kragthrope, the LSU director of player development, Kevin Faulk, attacked Fisher and a fist-fight began.  According to a release by Texas A&M University Police, Kragthorpe retracted his statements regarding being struck and that he required medical attention, although LSU disputed that a retraction was made. Video evidence later disputed Kragthrope's story and showed that he was not punched by Fisher.  Instead, Kragthrope was seen yelling and confronting the Texas A&M receiving corps and was shoved away by Fisher. No reported injuries were sustained by Kragthrope, Faulk, or Fisher and no charges were issued.

See also
2022 Houston vs. SMU football game, the record-holder for highest-scoring regulation FBS football game (non-overtime)
2001 Arkansas vs. Ole Miss football game, the first FBS football game to reach seven overtimes
2003 Arkansas vs. Kentucky football game, the second FBS football game to reach seven overtimes
2021 Illinois vs. Penn State football game, the first FBS football game to reach nine overtimes

References

2018 Southeastern Conference football season
vs. Texas AandM 2018
vs. LSU 2018
2018 in sports in Texas
November 2018 sports events in the United States